Petra Lupačová (born 13 April 1968) is a Czech handball player. She competed in the women's tournament at the 1988 Summer Olympics.

References

1968 births
Living people
Czech female handball players
Olympic handball players of Czechoslovakia
Handball players at the 1988 Summer Olympics
Sportspeople from Zlín